The Party of United Democrats of Macedonia (ПОДЕМ; Partija na obedineti demokrati na Makedonija, PODEM) is a centre-left political party in North Macedonia. It was founded on 12 July 2008 by former members of the New Social Democratic Party, after the 2008 parliamentary elections.

References

External links
PODEM web site

2008 establishments in the Republic of Macedonia
Political parties established in 2008
Political parties in North Macedonia